Maswasi is a town and a nagar panchayat in Rampur district in the Indian state of Uttar Pradesh.

Demographics
 India census, Maswasi had a population of 15,207. Males constitute 53% of the population and females 47%. Maswasi has an average literacy rate of 73%, higher than the national average of 59.5%: male literacy is 84%, and female literacy is 61%. In Maswasi, 20% of the population is under 6 years of age.

References

Cities and towns in Rampur district